Labone is a district of Accra, Ghana.

It may also refer to:

People 
 Brian Labone (1940–2006), English footballer
 Jean Luc Labone, 2013 French bronze medalist in the Europe (dinghy)  
 Vicky Labone, character played by Moira Lister in the British TV series Late Night Theatre
 Miss Labone, character played by Joan Glover in the 1997 film Lolita

Other uses 
 Labone Senior High School, a public school in Accra, Ghana
 LabOne, a corporation acquired in 2005 by Quest Diagnostics

See also 
 La Bonne, a 1986 Italian erotic film